Mostafa Mir-Salim, was named as Islamic Coalition Party's nominee for Iranian presidential election, 2017 in December 2016. He launched his campaign in April 2017.

Provincial visits

Political positions

Foreign policy 
In the first step visited DESA (company).
In a speech at Mazandaran University, Mir-Salim said “Diplomatically speaking, we should have further engagement with the neighboring states such as Afghanistan, Turkey and Qatar because we have common interests with the neighbors which can be met through engagement and consultation”. He also stated that Iran has been committed to the Joint Comprehensive Plan of Action, while other parties “failed to completely fulfill all its commitments”. He blamed the incumbent government for not using the opportunity of nuclear deal, noting that he will use the opportunity to develop exports.

Endorsements

Parties 
 Islamic Coalition Party

Individuals 
 Asadollah Badamchian

References 

 

2017 Iranian presidential election
Election campaigns in Iran